Patrick Winterton (born 15 September 1961) is a British cross-country skier. He competed in the men's 15 kilometre classical event at the 1988 Winter Olympics.

Since 2019, Winterton has been lead commentator on the BBC Scotland sports series The Adventure Show. He also is a commentator on Eurosport covering Cross Country skiing & Biathlon.

References

External links
 

1961 births
Living people
British male cross-country skiers
Olympic cross-country skiers of Great Britain
Cross-country skiers at the 1988 Winter Olympics
Sportspeople from Aldershot